Mateusz Rutkowski (born 18 April 1986) is a Polish former ski jumper. He represented the Polish national team to win a gold medal at the 2004 World Junior Championships individually, and silver medal with the team at the same championships.

Personal life 
Mateusz Rutkowski was born in Skrzypne, Poland. He has a younger brother Łukasz, who is a ski jumper too. Mateusz was considered the most talented Polish ski jumper and Adam Małysz's successor.

Career 
February 7, 2004 he won the gold medal at the World Junior Championships as the first Pole in history. During the competition set a record (104,5 m) of Bjørkelibakken hill in Stryn, Norway. As a third Pole in history he jumped above 200 m during World Cup competition on Letalnica in Planica. After his problems with alcohol, weight and lack of discipline he
was thrown from Polish national ski jumping team after season 2004/2005. Later he trained only at his club Wisła Zakopane.

References 

1986 births
Living people
Polish male ski jumpers
People from Nowy Targ County
Sportspeople from Zakopane
21st-century Polish people